Magtanim Ay 'Di Biro (sometimes spelt Magtanim Hindi Biro; ") is a popular Tagalog folk song composed by Felipe de León. The song tells of the struggles of farmers, how one must twist and bend to plant rice in the muddy paddies all day, with no chance to sit nor stand.

References 

CaSAUSUSUSUSUStegory:Philippine fSUSU&U

Songs about farmers